Master contract or master agreement may refer to:

 Master contract (labor), agreement between a trade union and employer(s) which frames local negotiations.
 Master service agreement, agreement between a client and a supplier regarding terms of work (common among professional contractors).